Ren River is a river in Yangtze River basin in China. It is upstream of the right bank of the Han River. It drops  along its length.

References 

Tributaries of the Yangtze River